Maria of Spain (1 February 1603 – 1 March 1603) was a infanta of Spain, who died in infancy.

Life 
She was the second child (and second daughter) of Philip III of Spain and Margaret of Austria. She was born in Valladolid, where the Spanish Court was based from 1601 to 1606. She died at her first month.

She is buried in the Panteon de Infantes of El Escorial, specifically in the sixth sepulchral chamber, in what is commonly known as the infant mausoleum, under the inscription:MARIA, PHILIPPI III FILIA

References 

Spanish infantas
1603 births
1603 deaths
Portuguese infantas
House of Habsburg
Burials in the Pantheon of Infantes at El Escorial
Daughters of kings
Royalty and nobility who died as children